During the occupation of Ukraine by Nazi Germany, its Jewish community was subject to persecution and deportation to extermination camps. This is the list of Ukrainian Righteous Among the Nations. , 2,619 Ukrainians have been honored with this title by Yad Vashem, the Holocaust Martyrs' and Heroes' Remembrance Authority of the state of Israel, for saving Jews during World War II. These people risked their lives or their liberty and position to help Jews during the Holocaust; some suffered death as a result. Below is a partial listing of these individuals:

List

Aleksei Glagolev
 Klymentiy Sheptytsky
 Kateryna Sikorska
 Yurii Dmitrievich Sokolov

See also
Word of the Righteous

References

 
Righteous Among the Nations
Ukraine
Jewish Ukrainian history
Ukrainian Righteous
Ukraine in World War II
Ukrainian anti-fascists